Edgar Freitas Gomes da Silva (born 25 September 1962, in Funchal, São Martinho) is a Portuguese politician and former Catholic priest. He is known for having been a bitter dissident from the Portuguese Catholic hierarchy.

Edgar Silva is a licenciate in Theology and holds a master's degree in Systematic Theology from the Catholic University of Portugal. He has been a militant of the Portuguese Communist Party since 1997, and also a member of its Central Committee since 10 December 2000.

He was a candidate to the 2016 presidential election.

Works
Among his published books, there can be found works on social and human development issues such as:
 Os instrangeiros na Madeira. Funchal: Edgar Silva, 2005. .
 Madeira, tempo perdido. Funchal: Edgar Silva, 2007. .
 Os bichos da Corte do Ogre usam máscaras de riso. 2010.
 Silva, Edgar; Vilarigues, Sofia (2011). Pontes de Mudança, sociedades sustentáveis e solidárias. Funchal: Antagonista. .

References

External links

 Biography of Edgar Silva on the Portuguese Communist Party website
 Official Campaign Website
 Official Campaign Facebook profile
 Official Campaign Twitter profile

1962 births
People from Funchal
Living people
Catholic University of Portugal alumni
Portuguese Roman Catholic priests
Portuguese communists
Members of the Legislative Assembly of Madeira
Liberation theologians
Catholic socialists
Portuguese Christian socialists
Laicized Roman Catholic priests
Portuguese Communist Party politicians
20th-century Portuguese politicians
21st-century Portuguese politicians